The Association of Musical Electronics Industry (AMEI) is an organization where companies work together to create the standards that assure compatibility among electronic musical instruments, particularly MIDI products. The AMEI is a Japanese organization established in 1996.

See also 
 MIDI Manufacturers Association
 Japan MIDI Standards Committee

References

External links 
 Association of Musical Electronics Industry (AMEI)

MIDI
Organizations established in 1996
1996 establishments in Japan
Kanda, Tokyo